Meng Keo Pichenda is a Cambodian singer and has been contracted to many companies for her services. She is the youngest of three sisters, two of them are vocal musicians.

She is well known for her unique and balanced sound-pitched voice and was particularly successful in the late 1990s, credited for a change in direction in Cambodian music. However, she prefers writing traditional Khmer songs rather than dance music.

She began traditional Khmer dancing when she was just a young girl, and when she turned 17 her music career began. Her style of music attracts the youth of Cambodia as well as adults. She is considered one of the most popular artists in Cambodia today. Some of the more recent tracks released are composed by Meng Keo Pichenda herself.

Note
In the year 2000 to recent, she is credited as Meng Keo Picheta in DVDs and Albums. She sometimes appears in various Live Shows companies.

References

20th-century Cambodian women singers
1974 births
Living people
21st-century Cambodian women singers